Rabia Kaya (born 5 December 1994) is a Turkish weightlifter. She won the silver medal in the women's 75kg event at the 2017 Islamic Solidarity Games held in Baku, Azerbaijan.

In 2017, she competed in the women's 75kg event at the European Weightlifting Championships held in Split, Croatia without winning a medal. In the same year, she also represented Turkey at the 2017 Summer Universiade held in Taipei, Taiwan in the women's 75kg event. In this event she finished in 6th place.

At the 2018 Mediterranean Games in Tarragona, Spain, she won the bronze medal in the 75 kg Snatch event.

References

External links 
 

Living people
1994 births
Place of birth missing (living people)
Turkish female weightlifters
Competitors at the 2017 Summer Universiade
Competitors at the 2018 Mediterranean Games
Mediterranean Games bronze medalists for Turkey
Mediterranean Games medalists in weightlifting
Islamic Solidarity Games medalists in weightlifting
21st-century Turkish women